The name Ester has been used for five tropical cyclones in the Philippines by PAGASA in the Western Pacific.

Typhoon Ewiniar (2006) (T0603, 04W, Ester)
Severe Tropical Storm Dianmu (2010) (T1004, 05W, Ester)
Tropical Storm Mitag (2014) (T1407, Ester) – was only recognized by PAGASA and JMA as a tropical storm, and by JTWC as a subtropical storm.
Tropical Storm Gaemi (2018) (T1806, 08W, Ester)
Tropical Storm Trases (2022) (T2206, 07W, Ester)

Pacific typhoon set index articles